Charles-Augustin is a given name. Notable people with the name include:

Charles-Augustin de Coulomb (1736–1806), French military engineer and physicist
Charles V Augustin van de Werve, 3rd Count of Vorsselaer
Charles Augustin Sainte-Beuve (1804–1869), French literary critic

Compound given names